Epomis dejeani is a species of ground beetle native to the Palearctic and the Middle East. It is known from Bosnia and Herzegovina, Greece, Hungary, Israel, Italy, Russia, Syria, Turkey, and Ukraine.

Adult beetles are metallic blue or green-colored, with a striking yellow-orange rim on the elytra and mostly yellow-colored legs and antennae.

Like many ground beetle larvae they are elongated with two extensions (urogomphi) at the rear end. They have characteristic double-hooked mandibles. The larvae feed exclusively on amphibians, which they lure by waving their antennae and making prey-like movements. The larvae can often evade the first strike of the amphibian by being alert, and then strike back at once, while the amphibian is in close proximity. Latching on with their mandibles, they suck the body fluids of their new host, progressing to chewing its skin and eating its tissues. Eventually they may kill their host. Even if they are taken into the amphibian's mouth at the first strike, they may survive; one young frog appeared to find the larva it caught distasteful, failed to spit it out, swallowed it, only to regurgitate it a couple of hours later, covered with mucus but apparently unharmed. When the larvae molt, they drop off their host and need to find a new one. 

The adult beetles are generalist predators and scavengers, but can also feed on amphibians much larger than themselves.

References

External links 
 Epomis dejeani Dejean, 1831, Carabidae of the World
 

Licininae
Beetles of Asia
Beetles of Europe
Fauna of Western Asia